Our Man in the Company is an Australian comedy series which screened on the ABC in 1973 and 1974. This series was a spin-off from the controversial series Our Man in Canberra.

Cast
 Jeff Ashby as Humphrey Sullivan
 Katy Wild as Kate Sullivan 
 Walter Sullivan as The Minister/The Director
 Delore Whiteman as Ena Wheeler
 Benita Collings as Turner
 Lex Mitchell as Pub Philosopher
 Graham Rouse as Pub Philosopher

See also 
 List of Australian television series

Notes

External links 
 
 Our Man in the Company Classic Australian TV

Australian television sitcoms
Australian Broadcasting Corporation original programming
English-language television shows
Television shows set in New South Wales
1971 Australian television series debuts
1974 Australian television series endings
Black-and-white Australian television shows
Australian workplace comedy television series
1970s sitcoms